Neumark comprised a region of the Prussian province of Brandenburg, Germany.

Neumark may also refer to:
 Neumark, Thuringia
 Neumark, Saxony
 Neumark (surname)
 Nowe Miasto Lubawskie (German: Neumark in Westpreußen), a town once in West Prussia, in Poland, situated at river Drwęca
 Všeruby (Domažlice District) or Neumark, a market town in the Czech Republic
 Hungarian March, or Neumark, a brief frontier march established by Emperor Henry III